Big Sir is the first album by Big Sir, which is composed of bassist Juan Alderete and vocalist Lisa Papineau.

Track listing
All songs by Alderete, Papineau and Bouillet, except where indicated.

 "Speedy's Lament" (Speedy) - 1:25
 "Lisa's Theme" - 4:42
 "The Pistol Chasers" - 2:41
 "Nonstop Drummer" - 3:54
 "Sad Elephant" - 4:29
 "Fuzak" (Alderete, Papineau) - 3:23
 "Le Baron" - 4:03
 "Ruby Road" (Alderete, Papineau) - 3:13
 "G7 Intro" (not listed) - 0:12
 "G7" - 3:26
 "Speedy's Lament (Reprise)" (not listed) - 0:23

Personnel
Big Sir
Lisa Papineau - vocals, keyboards, sea shanty guitar on "G7"
Juan Alderete - bass, backing vocals
Troy Zeigler - drums, backing vocals
Additional musicians
Speedy - vocals on "Speedy's Lament"
Bruce Bouillet - keyboards on "Lisa's Theme", "Sad Elephant" and "Le Baron"; backing vocals
Jennifer Weinberg, Todd O'Keefe, Justin Rocherolle - backing vocals
Michael Regilio - guitar on "The Pistol Chasers"
Anu Kirk - keyboards on "Nonstop Drummer" and "Fuzak"
Fred C. - voice on "Sad Elephant"
Eric Mayron - synthesizer on "Sad Elephant" and "Le Baron"
Heather Lockie - viola on "Fuzak"
Willis - voice on "Le Baron"
Josh Hagen - reverb guitar on "G7"

References

2001 debut albums
Big Sir (band) albums